Sean Wilson (born 7 November 1969 in York, England) is a former international speedway rider who has ridden for Great Britain at test level.

Career summary
Wilson had a career spanning 20 years, starting and finishing at Sheffield. He became Premier League Riders Champion three times.

His career ended early due to a number of injuries. In 2004 whilst riding in Joe Screen's testimonial at Belle Vue he crushed the C7 vertebrate in his neck leaving him in a neck brace for several months. He returned in 2005 but suffered a dislocated shoulder and a fractured humerus. He was subsequently, much to his disappointment, released at the end of 2005 which triggered a retirement.

After retirement
Wilson now has a speedway engine building business and counts former world champion Gary Havelock, Kyle Legault and David Howe amongst his past and present customers.

References

External links 

1969 births
Living people
British speedway riders
Sheffield Tigers riders
Bradford Dukes riders
Coventry Bees riders
King's Lynn Stars riders